Pomper is a surname. Notable people with the surname include:

Brian Pomper, American lawyer, political strategist, and lobbyist
Margriet Pomper (born 1954), Dutch long track speed skater
Sean Pomper, American inventor
Tibor Pomper (born 1977), Hungarian footballer

See also
Pomp (disambiguation)